Thailand was the host nation for the 1966 Asian Games in Bangkok on 9–20 October 1978. Thailand ended the games at 37 overall medals including 12 gold medals.

Nations at the 1966 Asian Games
1966
Asian Games